The Election Commission of India held indirect 10th presidential elections of India on 16 July 1992. Shankar Dayal Sharma with 675,864 votes won over his nearest rival George Gilbert Swell who got 346,485 votes.

Candidates
This presidential election, saw many candidates competing for the presidency, due to the divide nationally for power. The top two candidates were, Shankar Dayal Sharma, put forth by Indian National Congress and George Gilbert Swell, member of Rajya Sabha, from Meghalaya, as the Independent candidate supported by the BJP and National Front.

Results
Source: Web archive of Election Commission of India website

References

1992 elections in India
Presidential elections in India